The 2022–23 season is MKS Cracovia's 117th season in existence and the club's tenth consecutive season in the top flight of Polish football. In addition to the domestic league, MKS Cracovia will participate in this season's edition of the Polish Cup. The season covers the period from 1 July 2022 to 30 June 2023.

Players

First-team squad

Out on loan

Players under contract

Pre-season and friendlies

Competitions

Overview

Ekstraklasa

League table

Results summary

Results by round

Matches
The league fixtures were announced on 1 June 2022.

Polish Cup

Statistics

Goalscorers

References

MKS Cracovia seasons
MKS Cracovia